Grzegorz Marian Woźny (pronounced , born 19 July 1946 in Pudliszki), is a Polish politician. He was elected to the Sejm on 25 September 2005, getting 9178 votes in 36 the Kalisz district as a candidate from the Democratic Left Alliance list.

He was also a member of the Senate 1993-1997, the Sejm 1997-2001 and the Sejm 2001-2005.

See also
Members of Polish Sejm 2005-2007

External links
Grzegorz Woźny - parliamentary page - includes declarations of interest, voting record, and transcripts of speeches.

1946 births
Living people
Democratic Left Alliance politicians
Members of the Senate of Poland 1993–1997
Members of the Polish Sejm 1997–2001
Members of the Polish Sejm 2001–2005
Members of the Polish Sejm 2005–2007